Red Rocket is a 2021 American black comedy drama film directed by Sean Baker from a screenplay co-written with Chris Bergoch. It stars Simon Rex, Bree Elrod, and Suzanna Son. The plot follows a porn star (Rex) who returns to his hometown and begins a relationship with an adolescent girl (Son).

The film premiered at the Cannes Film Festival in competition for the Palme d'Or on July 14, 2021. It was released in limited theaters on December 10, 2021, by A24. It received praise for its direction and Rex's performance and received a variety of awards and nominations. The National Board of Review listed it among the top ten films of the year. Rex also won Best Actor awards from the Los Angeles Film Critics Association and the Independent Spirit Awards.

Plot
After a 17-year absence, Mikey Saber returns to Texas City, his Gulf Coast hometown. Badly bruised and destitute, Mikey arrives at the modest home shared by Lexi, his estranged wife, and her mother Lil. Mikey begs Lexi and Lil to let him stay at their house. They reluctantly agree but insist that he get a job and perform household chores.

Mikey tries to find work at a diner and a Dollar General store, but is hindered by a long gap in his résumé. After Mikey admits to potential employers that he spent those years working as a porn star in Los Angeles, they refuse to hire him. Desperate, Mikey persuades Leondria, a marijuana dealer, to give him his old job back selling marijuana. Leondria and her daughter June suspect that Mikey will smoke it himself, but after he returns with his earnings, their business arrangement continues.

After sleeping on the couch for several nights, Mikey starts having sex with Lexi. Eventually, she invites him to share her bedroom. Mikey gives Lexi and Lil a month's rent in advance and takes them to a donut shop to celebrate. He becomes smitten with Strawberry, a 17-year-old girl who works at the counter. He returns and persuades her to let him sell marijuana to the construction workers who frequent the shop. Strawberry and Mikey soon start a sexual relationship.

Mikey befriends Lexi's neighbor Lonnie, who is intrigued by Mikey's stories about his porn career and sexual encounters. They visit a strip club and spend time together, but Mikey becomes upset when he discovers Lonnie pretending to be an Army veteran at a local mall. 

Mikey causes Strawberry to break up with Nash, her high-school boyfriend. Nash and his parents confront Mikey in the donut shop parking lot and beat him. Mikey repeatedly tries to persuade Strawberry to travel with him to Los Angeles to pursue a career in pornography. She and Mikey grow closer, causing him to grow more distant from Lexi. When he disappears for a weekend with Strawberry, Lexi grows suspicious and they get into an argument. Mikey berates her and brags about the $3,000 he made selling drugs for Leondria.

While riding in Lonnie's car Mikey causes Lonnie to swerve across traffic at a highway off-ramp, creating a multiple-vehicle collision which results in several injuries. Mikey and Lonnie flee the scene of the accident and Mikey begs Lonnie to hide his involvement in the accident. Mikey remains anxious but Lonnie assumes sole responsibility for the crash when he is arrested.

Using the crash as an excuse, Mikey visits Strawberry at work and asks her to come to Los Angeles with him and start her porn career. She agrees and quits her job. That night, Mikey tells Lexi that he is leaving for California in the morning. Lexi and Lil convince Leondria to send June and her brothers to seize the $3,000 that Mikey earned from selling pot. When Leondria's children confront him while he is sleeping, Mikey sneaks out of a window naked and runs to Leondria's house to beg her to return his money.

Leondria gives Mikey $200 and tells him to leave or face the threat of violence. Humiliated, Mikey leaves with a few meager possessions. After travelling all night on foot to Strawberry’s house, Mikey imagines seeing her dressed in a bikini in her doorway and his eyes well with tears.

Cast

Production
The low $1.1 million budget that the film was able to secure forced Baker to abandon a larger project and devote himself to Red Rocket. Baker and Bergoch conceived of the idea for the Saber character while researching the adult film industry for their film Starlet (2012), during which they met a number of men who fit the archetype of a "suitcase pimp," which Baker defines as “male talent who lives off a female talent in the adult film world."

With regard to casting, the director had Simon Rex in mind five years previous to shooting, but had never introduced himself until, on October 23, 2020, Baker called Rex, convinced him to send an audition tape via iPhone, giving him just five minutes to prepare. Rex, a model, MTV VJ, actor, and rapper - then drove to Texas to avoid a post-flight quarantine, as filming was set to begin in three days. David Rooney, writing for the Hollywood Reporter, referred to the casting of Rex as a "winking joke", as he had starred in solo masturbation videos for a gay pornography company before establishing himself in his career. Because Baker had asked Rex to trust him, Rex did not tell his agent about the film until after shooting had ended. Baker approached Suzanna Son in 2018 after a screening of Don't Worry He Won't Get Far on Foot ten days after she moved to Los Angeles. He did not call her for two years. Darbone was a waiter at a restaurant in Nederland when Baker approached him because he "liked his look." Rodriguez, who had been a regular at the Donut Hole location which was near the plant she worked before she was laid off, was walking her dog when Baker pulled over to ask her to audition.

Principal photography began on October 26, 2020, and concluded on November 19, 2020, in Texas, United States, during the COVID-19 pandemic, using rigorous safety protocols. Red Rocket was shot on 16 mm film by an Arriflex 16SR3 camera with Panavision 1.44x Auto Panatars, Zeiss Super Speed, Iscorama 54 and Canon Lenses. The film had a crew of 10 people, no rehearsal time and mostly non-actors.

Filming locations included restaurants in Texas City and Nederland, a donut shop in Groves, as well as the Kemah Boardwalk and Galveston Island Historic Pleasure Pier in Galveston. The Donut Hole was open for business in the morning while filming took place in the evening.

Securing the rights to the song "Bye Bye Bye" was not part of the initial budget. All five members of NSYNC had to approve its use. Actress Suzanna Son recorded a cover version of the song for the official motion picture soundtrack.

Creative influences
Baker has "devoted [his] career to tell stories that remove stigma and normalize lifestyles" of sex workers through his films. Baker stated that in Red Rocket he wanted to pay homage to "Italian eroticism" and sexploitation films by directors from the 1970s like Fernando Di Leo and Umberto Lenzi. He was also inspired by Steven Spielberg's The Sugarland Express for the outdoor scenes.

Release
A24 acquired distribution rights to the film in the United States and Canada in February 2021. FilmNation Entertainment later sold international distribution rights to Le Pacte for France, Roadshow Entertainment for Australia and New Zealand, Lev Cinemas for Israel and Focus Features elsewhere excluding the U.S. and Canada.

Red Rocket had its world premiere at the Cannes Film Festival on July 14, 2021, where it received a five minute standing ovation. It also screened at film festivals in  Deauville, Hamburg, London,  Mill Valley, Miskolc, New York, Telluride, Rome, San Sebastián and Vancouver among others.

A drive-in screening was scheduled as part of Travis Scott's Astroworld Festival featuring appearances by Baker, Scott, and the film's cast. In the aftermath of a mass casualty event at Scott's concert three days earlier, the event was cancelled.

The film had a limited theatrical release on December 10, 2021, beginning in New York and Los Angeles. Lionsgate released the movie on DVD and Blu-Ray on March 15, 2022.

Reception

Box office 
In its opening weekend, the film earned $88,195 from 6 theaters for a per screen average of $14,699. It went on to gross $1 million in the U.S. and $1.2 million internationally for a total box office gross of $2.2 million.

Critical response 

 

In Deadline, Todd McCarthy wrote that "[e]ven before much happens, the sense of a very specific location and cultural mindset [in Red Rocket] is very intense." He praised both Baker and lead Simon Rex for their "tremendous energy" and said the film "feels as creatively pure as a novel by a kid just out of college." Matt Zoller Seitz of RogerEbert.com, on the other hand, described it as a "rambling 130-minute film," calling the middle section "wherein Mikey ensnares [the] freckle-faced 17-year-old donut shop employee... Strawberry (Suzanna Son)" and schemes their escape to Los Angeles so that he can lead her to adult film stardom as "one-note and repetitious" in particular. David Rooney of The Hollywood Reporter also criticized the film mildly for "prolix stretches", saying "it could have used some tightening. But it's a pleasure to put yourself in Baker's capable hands." Said Peter Bradshaw of The Guardian: "With Red Rocket, Sean Baker has given us an adult American pastoral, essentially a comedy, and another study of tough lives at the margin, close in spirit to his lo-fi breakthrough Tangerine." Richard Lawson in Vanity Fair wrote, "Baker's choice is a rather perfect one—in contextual terms and actual ones, too. Rex's performance is fleet and nimble, gregarious and shaded in darkness. He and Baker make staccato music together."

Some reactions to the film stirred a debate about sexual morality in film in the post Me Too era. Seitz of RogerEbert.com concluded that Red Rocket is "the least of the list" of Baker and Bergoch's "impressive library of realistic movies about the rainbow coalition of the American underclass", and went on to question moments in the sexually graphic Red Rocket where, "if the filmmakers aren't exactly endorsing their protagonist's middle-aged, borderline pedo-pimp obsession with Strawberry, they're not being as rigorous about mediating it as they should." Brianna Zigler in Gawker responded: "It was both refreshing and exhilarating to watch an anti-hero go that low, during a time where it seems like audiences feel obligated to reject bad fictional behavior that isn’t explicitly punished." Variety Clayton Davis said the film's "risqué" subject matter could be a hindrance but encouraged award voters to nominate Rex, Baker, and Bergoch for Academy Awards.

Accolades 

Red Rocket was ineligible for Screen Actors Guild Award nominations.

References

External links
 
 
 
 
 Official screenplay

2021 films
2021 comedy-drama films
American comedy-drama films
Films directed by Sean Baker
Films impacted by the COVID-19 pandemic
2021 independent films
FilmNation Entertainment films
A24 (company) films
Films set in 2016
Films shot in 16 mm film
Films shot in Texas
Films set in Texas
Texas City, Texas
2020s English-language films
2020s American films
American independent films